Matt Martin (born March 5, 1984) is a Chicago politician and the alderman of the city's 47th ward. He won election as alderman in 2019 and took office as a member of the Chicago City Council in May 2019. The 47th ward includes all or parts of North Center, Lincoln Square, Lakeview, and Uptown.

Early life and career
Matt Martin was born in Arizona and attended Northwestern University on a music scholarship, where he majored in jazz studies and political science. He later graduated from Harvard Law School. Martin later worked as a civil rights lawyer in the Illinois Attorney General's office, and co-founded the Heart of Lincoln Square Neighbors Association.

2019 aldermanic campaign 
Matt Martin's campaign emphasized funding public schools, maintaining affordability in the ward, property tax relief for homeowners, and police accountability. He was endorsed by the Chicago Tribune which noted that Martin "has an independent streak and shares our determination that a new City Council put away its rubber stamp and flex its legislative muscle. We believe Martin can be an influential new voice on a re-energized council." In addition, he was endorsed by former Cook County Clerk David Orr and organizations such as ONE People's Campaign and United Working Families.

He finished first with 39.4% in a nine-candidate field in the election held on February 26, 2019 and then faced Michael Negron, who finished in second place with 21.4%, in a runoff election held on April 2, 2019. Following the first round election, he received a number of additional endorsements from elected officials and organizations including 49th ward alderwoman-elect Maria Hadden, 35th ward alderman Carlos Ramirez-Rosa, U.S. Representative Jan Schakowsky (D-IL), the Chicago Teachers Union, and SEIU Healthcare Illinois. On April 2, 2019, he won the runoff election with 62.6% of the vote.

On April 10, 2019, Martin joined six other newly elected members of the City Council in protesting against the approval of tax increment financing for the Lincoln Yards and The 78 real estate developments.

Chicago City Council (2019–present)

City-wide issues

City budget 
Martin was one of 11 aldermen who voted against Mayor Lori Lightfoot's proposed 2020 budget, alongside other members of the Progressive Caucus. In a statement, Martin said "While I commend the Mayor and her budget team for filling this year’s budget gap without layoffs or a significant property tax increase, ultimately, I saw a number of critical missed opportunities to seek more progressive sources of revenue, fund our social services in a more robust manner, and pursue structural changes that will set us on the path to solvency." Martin held multiple public events and town hall meetings about the budget before and after the vote.

Alliances and relationships 
At the start of the 2019–23 term, Martin joined City Council's Progressive Caucus and Black Caucus.

Electoral history

See also
List of Chicago aldermen since 1923

References

External links
 
 
 
 
 Matt Martin at Illinois Sunshine

1984 births
21st-century American politicians
African-American lawyers
African-American people in Illinois politics
American people of Hausa descent
American people of Nigerien descent
Chicago City Council members
Harvard Law School alumni
Illinois Democrats
Living people
Northwestern University alumni
Politicians from Chicago
21st-century African-American politicians
20th-century African-American people